Bonvouloir may refer to:
Bonvouloir Islands in Papua New Guinea
Émile Bonvouloir (1875-1969), Canadian politician
Julien Alexandre Achard de Bonvouloir (1749-1783), French envoy to America